
Gmina Tczew is a rural gmina (administrative district) in Tczew County, Pomeranian Voivodeship, in northern Poland. Its seat is the town of Tczew, although the town is not part of the territory of the gmina.

Villages
Gmina Tczew contains the villages and settlements of Bałdowo, Bojary, Boroszewo, Czarlin, Czatkowy, Dąbrówka Tczewska, Dalwin, Damaszka, Gniszewo, Goszyn, Knybawa, Koziary, Lądy, Liniewko, Lubiszewo Tczewskie, Łukocin, Małe Rokitki, Małe Turze, Malenin, Małżewko, Małżewo, Mieścin, Miłobądz, Miłobądz Mały, Młynki, Owczarki, Piwnice, Polesie, Rokitki, Rukosin, Śliwiny, Stanisławie, Swarożyn, Świetlikowo, Szczerbięcin, Szpęgawa, Tczewskie Łąki, Turze, Waćmierek, Wędkowy, Zabagno, Zajączkowo, Zajączkowo-Dworzec, Zajączkowo-Wybudowanie and Zwierzynek.

Neighbouring gminas
Gmina Tczew is bordered by the town of Tczew and by the gminas of Lichnowy, Miłoradz, Pszczółki, Skarszewy, Starogard Gdański, Subkowy, Suchy Dąb and Trąbki Wielkie.

References
Polish official population figures 2006

Tczew
Tczew County